Antiochtha coelatella is a moth in the family Lecithoceridae. It was described by Francis Walker in 1864. It is found in Sri Lanka.

Adults are cinereous (ash gray), the wings with a whitish marginal line. The forewings are purplish, with two transverse whitish costal streaks, and with a whitish discal ringlet. There are two whitish dots, the interior one near the interior border, the exterior one contiguous to the interior border.

References

Moths described in 1864
Antiochtha